Joseph Taylor (September 22, 1837 – February 16, 1912) was an English soldier who fought for the Union Army in the United States during the American Civil War. He received the Medal of Honor for valor.

Biography
Taylor served in the American Civil War in the 7th Rhode Island Infantry. He received the Medal of Honor on July 20, 1897 for his actions at the Battle of Globe Tavern on August 18, 1864.

He is buried at Edson Cemetery in Lowell, Massachusetts

Medal of Honor citation
Rank and organization: Private, Company E, 7th Rhode Island Infantry. Place and date: At Weldon Railroad, VA., 18 August 1865. Entered service at: Burrillville, RI. Birth: England. Date of Issue: 20 July 1897.

Citation:

While acting as an orderly to a general officer on the field and alone, encountered a picket of 3 of the enemy and compelled their surrender.

See also

List of American Civil War Medal of Honor recipients: T-Z

References

External links

Military Times

1837 births
1912 deaths
Union Army soldiers
United States Army Medal of Honor recipients
American Civil War recipients of the Medal of Honor
People from Lowell, Massachusetts
English-born Medal of Honor recipients
English emigrants to the United States